Nemophas tricolor is a species of beetle in the family Cerambycidae. It was described by Heller in 1896. It is known from Sulawesi, Indonesia.

References

tricolor
Beetles described in 1896